There are at least 10 named lakes and reservoirs in Pike County, Arkansas.

Lakes
Alford Lake, el.  
 Round Pond, el.

Reservoirs
Lake Greeson, el.  
Lake Greeson Nursery Pond, el.  
Mill Pond, el.  
North Fork Ozan Creek Watershed Number One Reservoir, el.  
North Fork Ozan Creek Watershed Number Two Reservoir, el.  
Teeter Lake, el.  
Tetter Lake Two, el.  
Womack Lake, el.

See also
 List of lakes in Arkansas

Notes

Bodies of water of Pike County, Arkansas
Pike